Khentii may refer to:

Khentii Province, Mongolia
Khentii Mountains, Mongolia